Czech Republic sent a delegation to compete at the 2008 Summer Paralympics in Beijing, People's Republic of China.

Medallists

Sports

Archery

Men

|-
|align=left|Jiri Klich
|align=left|Men's individual compound open
|676
|6
|
|W 106-103
|L 110-111
|colspan=3|did not advance
|-
|align=left|David Drahoninsky
|align=left rowspan=2|Men's individual compound W1
|665
|1
|colspan=2 
|W 106-102
|W 99-97
|W 108-103
|
|-
|align=left|Zdenek Sebek
|586
|11
|
|L 100-104
|colspan=4|did not advance
|}

Women

|-
|align=left|Miroslava Cerna
|align=left rowspan=3|Women's individual recurve W1/W2
|476
|17
|L 87-89
|colspan=5|did not advance
|-
|align=left|Lenka Kuncova
|515
|13
|W 84-49
|L 85-103
|colspan=4|did not advance
|-
|align=left|Marketa Sidkova
|593
|3
|
|L 74-82
|colspan=4|did not advance
|-
|align=left|Miroslava Cerna Lenka Kuncova Marketa Sidkova
|align=left|Women's team recurve
|1584
|6
|colspan=2 
|W 174-167
|L 184-199
|W 184-182
|
|}

Athletics

Men's field

Women's track

Women's field

Boccia

Cycling

Men's road

Men's track

Women's road

Powerlifting

Men

Shooting

Men

Swimming

Men

Women

Table tennis

Men

Women

See also
Czech Republic at the Paralympics
Czech Republic at the 2008 Summer Olympics

External links
International Paralympic Committee

Nations at the 2008 Summer Paralympics
2008
Summer Paralympics